The Croatian League 1948–49 was an association football competition in Croatia organized by the Football Federation of Croatia, a sub-organization under the umbrella of the Football Association of Yugoslavia (FSJ).

The competition was part of the third tier of the football pyramid in Yugoslavia with the winner being promoted to the Yugoslav Second League.

References
 Standings

Croatian First league seasons
Yugo
3